Giuseppe Vavassori (29 June 1934 – 21 November 1983) was an Italian professional footballer who played as a goalkeeper.

After his death a stadium in Rivoli was named after him.

Honours
Juventus
 Serie A champion: 1957–58, 1959–60, 1960–61.
 Coppa Italia winner: 1958–59, 1959–60.

Bologna
 Coppa Italia winner: 1969–70.

External links
 

1934 births
1983 deaths
People from Rivoli, Piedmont
Italian footballers
Italy international footballers
Serie A players
Juventus F.C. players
Catania S.S.D. players
Bologna F.C. 1909 players

Association football goalkeepers
Footballers from Piedmont
Sportspeople from the Metropolitan City of Turin